Oxogestone, also known as 20β-hydroxy-19-norprogesterone, is a progestin of the 19-norprogesterone group which was synthesized in 1953 and was developed as an injectable hormonal contraceptive in the early 1970s but was never marketed. A C20β phenylpropionate derivative, oxogestone phenpropionate, also exists.

References

Abandoned drugs
Diketones
Hormonal contraception
Norpregnanes
Progestogens